The ASUN Conference, formerly the Atlantic Sun Conference, is a collegiate athletic conference operating mostly in the Southeastern United States. The league participates at the NCAA Division I level, and began sponsoring football at the Division I FCS level in 2022. Originally established as the Trans America Athletic Conference (TAAC) in 1978, it was renamed as the Atlantic Sun Conference in 2001, and then rebranded as the ASUN Conference in 2016. The conference headquarters are located in Atlanta.7

History

Formation 
The conference was first formed on September 19, 1978 as the Trans America Athletic Conference, at the Dallas-Fort Worth Regional Airport Marina Hotel. Its charter members were Oklahoma City University, Pan American University (later renamed University of Texas-Pan American), Northeast Louisiana University (now known as the University of Louisiana at Monroe), Houston Baptist University, Hardin-Simmons University, Centenary College of Louisiana, Samford University, and Mercer University, all of whom were previously D-I independents. None of the eight charter members remain in the conference today.

Almost immediately after its formation, the conference experienced a shake-up in its membership. Oklahoma City departed to become a charter member of the Midwestern City Conference (known today as the Horizon League), while UTPA returned to D-I independent status— both had only played a single season in the infant league. The TAAC was quick to replace the outgoing members with Northwestern State University and the University of Arkansas at Little Rock, along with Georgia Southern University in 1980, but this instability would prove to be a trend through the coming years— over the next 20 years, the conference would accept 16 new members, with many of these leaving after only playing a handful of seasons. 1982 saw the departure of another charter member, Northeast Louisiana, to the Southland Conference. Additionally, it saw the arrival of Nicholls State University, who was originally planned to join the TAAC as a full member. However, due to an oversight by the NCAA, adding in a new program who had not competed in Division I for at least 5 years would result in the offending conference forfeiting their automatic bid to the NCAA Division I men's basketball tournament. To get around this, the TAAC announced that Nicholls State would compete as a provisional member, ineligible for the men's basketball tournament until it completed its D-I transition in 1985. However, it, along with Northwestern State, left the conference in 1984 to join the Gulf Star Conference instead.

Expansion, Contraction, and Rebranding 
The remainder of the 1980s saw mostly growth for the conference, adding Georgia State University in 1983, Stetson University in 1985, and the University of Texas at San Antonio in 1986. However, near the end of the decade, the conference was hit with 5 departures over 4 consecutive years, beginning with Houston Baptist transitioning to the NAIA in 1989. This was followed by Hardin-Simmons dropping to NCAA Division III in 1990, UTSA and Arkansas-Little Rock leaving for the Southland and Sun Belt conferences in 1991, respectively, and Georgia Southern leaving for the Southern Conference in 1992. In the midst of this, the conference began to relentlessly pursue expansion throughout the 90s to offset these losses, adding Florida International University in 1990, Southeastern Louisiana University and the College of Charleston in 1991, the University of Central Florida in 1992, Florida Atlantic University in 1993, Campbell University in 1994, Jacksonville State University in 1995, Troy State University in 1997, and Jacksonville University in 1998. Of these 9 schools, though, only 2 ended up staying with the conference for longer than 15 years.

The turn of the millennium saw another charter member in Centenary depart in 1999 for the Mid-Continent Conference (now the Summit League); the league was able to offset this with the addition of Belmont University in 2001. Around this same time, the conference sought to rebrand itself, changing its name from the Trans America Athletic Conference to the Atlantic Sun Conference. The newly rebranded A-Sun continued to expand into the 2000s, adding Gardner-Webb University in 2002, Lipscomb University in 2003, East Tennessee State University, Kennesaw State University, and the University of North Florida in 2005, and Florida Gulf Coast University & the University of South Carolina Upstate in 2007. It also lost its fair share of members as well— largely some of the aforementioned members that had been added during the 90s, such as FIU, Florida Atlantic, and Troy to the Sun Belt, Georgia State to the Colonial Athletic Association, and UCF to Conference USA, but it also saw the departure of Samford to the Ohio Valley Conference, leaving Mercer as the only remaining charter member.

Present Day, Sponsoring Football 
The start of the 2010s gave the A-Sun a bit of a reprieve from conference realignment, losing only Campbell and Belmont in 2011 and 2012 to the Big South and OVC, respectively, and only adding recent D-I upgrader Northern Kentucky University in 2012. 2014 saw the departure of its final charter member, Mercer, to the Southern Conference in 2014; however, the Bears continued to compete in the ASUN as an affiliate for beach volleyball, and added men's lacrosse to its ASUN membership in 2022. The A-Sun continued to expand and contract slowly through the mid 2010s, losing only Northern Kentucky and East Tennessee State (along with Mercer), and only adding the New Jersey Institute of Technology in 2015.

This slow pace didn't stay for long, however. The second half of the decade saw the conference rebranding a second time, to simply the ASUN Conference Two years later, the University of North Alabama arrived from the Division II Gulf South Conference, and Liberty University left the Big South for the ASUN. More recently, Bellarmine University joined from the Division II Great Lakes Valley Conference and NJIT left for the America East Conference in 2020–21.

However, arguably its biggest move in recent years was the announcement that the conference would be adding the University of Central Arkansas, Eastern Kentucky University, and former member Jacksonville State University, as incoming members on January 29, 2021, with the intent of sponsoring football in the Football Championship Subdivision (FCS) in 2022. However, with these three schools joining in 2021, the league partnered with another conference beginning to sponsor football also in 2022, the Western Athletic Conference (WAC), to allow the three teams to join the WAC as football affiliates for 2021, branding it interchangeably as the "ASUN–WAC Challenge" and "WAC–ASUN Challenge"; the two leagues will receive a combined bid to the FCS playoffs.

As soon as it was announced, however, the football league was thrown into jeopardy, as Jacksonville State announced it would be leaving once again in 2023 for Conference USA, an FBS conference. Liberty was also invited to C-USA for 2023, but had already competed as an FBS independent for some time and was not included in the ASUN's new football league. With the WAC also losing Sam Houston, another football-sponsoring school, to C-USA, the two conferences announced they would be renewing their alliance for the 2022 season. On September 17, 2021, the ASUN announced Austin Peay State University, a football-sponsoring school, as a new member for the 2022–23 season. In May 2022, local media in Charlotte, North Carolina, also reported that Queens University of Charlotte would start a transition from the Division II South Atlantic Conference as a new ASUN member, also effective on July 1 of that year. The ASUN officially announced this move on May 10.

The ASUN also expanded its associate membership in the 2020s. The conference started the decade with five associate members—Coastal Carolina in both beach volleyball and women's lacrosse, Mercer in beach volleyball only, and Akron, Kent State, and Howard in women's lacrosse. All of the women's lacrosse associates left by the 2021–22 school year. Akron and Kent State left after the 2020 season when their full-time home of the Mid-American Conference began sponsoring the sport. Coastal Carolina also left after the 2020 season for the SoCon. Howard moved several sports not sponsored by its full-time home of the Mid-Eastern Athletic Conference to the Northeast Conference, with women's lacrosse moving after the 2021 season. Coastal Carolina moved beach volleyball to C-USA after the 2020–21 school year.

However, the 2021–22 school year saw the arrival of eight new associates, as well as the return of former women's lacrosse associates Coastal Carolina and Delaware State for that sport. ASUN beach volleyball added Charleston, Stephen F. Austin, and UNC Wilmington. The largest change in associate membership involved the relaunch of ASUN men's lacrosse. Full member Bellarmine was joined by five new associates—Air Force, Cleveland State, Detroit Mercy, Robert Morris, and Utah.

The ASUN lost five beach volleyball members for 2022–23. The conference's four associates in that sport left for the Sun Belt Conference (SBC), which added that sport. Charleston, Stephen F. Austin, and UNC Wilmington all left the ASUN after a single season and Mercer also moved beach volleyball to the SBC. Also, departing full member Jacksonville State moved beach volleyball to its future home of C-USA a year before its all-sports move to that league.

Also for 2022–23, Mercer moved men's lacrosse into the ASUN after the SoCon shut down its men's lacrosse league, and new D-I member Lindenwood became an associate in both men's and women's lacrosse.

On October 14, 2022, Conference USA and Kennesaw State jointly announced that KSU would start a transition to FBS after the 2022 football season and join C-USA in 2024.

ESPN reported on December 9, 2022 that the ASUN and WAC had agreed to form a new football-only conference that plans to start play in 2024. The initial membership would consist of Austin Peay, Central Arkansas, Eastern Kentucky, and North Alabama from the ASUN, and Abilene Christian, Southern Utah, Stephen F. Austin, Tarleton, and Utah Tech from the WAC. UTRGV would become the 10th member upon its planned addition of football in 2025. The new football conference also reportedly plans to move "from what is currently known as FCS football to what is currently known as FBS football at the earliest practicable date." On December 20, the two conferences confirmed the football merger, announcing that the new football league would start play in 2023 under the tentative name of ASUN–WAC Football Conference. The new football league will play a six-game schedule before starting full round-robin conference play in 2024. Neither conference's announcement mentioned any plans to move to FBS.

Member schools

Current members

Notes

Associate members

Notes

Former members
School names and nicknames listed here reflect those used during the schools' time in the TAAC/ASUN. One school has changed both its name and nickname, and three others have changed only their nicknames:

Notes

Former associate members

Notes

Membership timeline

 

  

 Northeast Louisiana became the University of Louisiana at Monroe (Louisiana–Monroe) in 1999.
 Pan American, later known as Texas–Pan American or UTPA, merged with the University of Texas at Brownsville in 2015 to create the new University of Texas Rio Grande Valley (UTRGV). The new school inherited UTPA's athletic program.

Sports sponsored
As of the 2022–23 school year, the ASUN sponsors championship competition in 10 men's and 11 women's NCAA sanctioned sports.

In 2008, the ASUN, in an agreement with the Southern Conference (SoCon), Mid-Eastern Athletic Conference (MEAC), and Big South Conference, formed the Coastal Collegiate Swimming Association (CCSA) for schools sponsoring men's and women's swimming and diving within the associated conferences. For the past several years, the ASUN's Commissioner has served as the president of what was initially a swimming & diving-only conference. In 2014 the CCSA expanded to include several other schools from other conferences, and the following year the conference added beach volleyball (women-only at the NCAA level) as a sponsored sport, changing its name to the Coastal Collegiate Sports Association. Currently the conference has 17 member schools, with five men's swimming and diving teams, nine women's swimming & diving teams, and six beach volleyball teams. 
 
A more recent change to the roster of ASUN sports took place after the 2013–14 school year. Under a cooperative agreement between the ASUN and SoCon, the two leagues agreed to split lacrosse sponsorship. The SoCon took over the ASUN men's lacrosse league, while women's lacrosse sponsorship remained with the ASUN. The full alliance in women's lacrosse amicably ended after the 2017 season, with the SoCon sponsoring that sport from the 2018 season forward, but the two leagues continued in a cross-scheduling agreement until the SoCon dropped women's lacrosse after the 2021 season.

Still more recently, on September 13, 2016, the ASUN and Big South announced a football partnership that allows any ASUN members with scholarship football programs to become Big South football members, provided they are located within the general geographic footprint of the two conferences. At the time of announcement, the only ASUN member with a scholarship football program, Kennesaw State, was already a Big South football member. Should any ASUN member add scholarship football, or any non-scholarship football program of an ASUN school (at the time of announcement, Jacksonville and Stetson) upgrade to scholarship football, that team will automatically join Big South football. North Alabama joined Big South football under the terms of this agreement; although the school's home state of Alabama had no schools in either conference at the time it was announced as a future ASUN member, three of its neighboring states were home to six of the ASUN's eight members at that time.

When the ASUN announced the July 2021 entry of Central Arkansas, Eastern Kentucky, and Jacksonville State, it also stated that it would launch a scholarship FCS football league, but did not specify when football competition will begin. No current member is required to add football or change its current football standing. At a press conference on February 23, 2021, the ASUN announced that it had entered into a separate football partnership with the Western Athletic Conference (WAC), which had previously announced the relaunch of its football league at the FCS level in fall 2021 with the arrival of four new FCS member schools. The three incoming ASUN members joined the four incoming WAC members in a round-robin schedule branded as the "ASUN–WAC Challenge". Both conferences proposed an amendment to NCAA bylaws that would allow the alliance to receive an automatic bid to the FCS playoffs. The alliance had seven members, one more than the six normally required for an automatic bid, but were not in the same league for an adequate period to meet the current NCAA "continuity" requirement. The two leagues' proposal was successful, resulting in an automatic qualifier from the seven-team Challenge, colloquially dubbed "AQ7". With the 2022 arrival of Austin Peay providing the ASUN its sixth scholarship FCS program, the ASUN will start its football league in the 2022 season. However, because the ASUN and WAC were each left with only five playoff-eligible football members for 2022 after Jacksonville State (ASUN) and Sam Houston (WAC) started FBS transitions in that season, both leagues renewed their football partnership for 2022. As noted earlier, the two conferences will fully merge their football leagues in 2023.

Shortly after the addition of football was announced, the ASUN announced that it would reinstate men's lacrosse in the 2022 season, with the lacrosse partnership with the SoCon retained for the time being. The two full ASUN members with men's lacrosse programs, Bellarmine and Jacksonville, separated for that sport, with Bellarmine joining the new ASUN lacrosse league and Jacksonville remaining in SoCon men's lacrosse. Air Force moved from SoCon men's lacrosse; men's lacrosse independent Utah joined; and all three Horizon League members with men's lacrosse programs also joined, with Detroit Mercy moving from the Metro Atlantic Athletic Conference and Cleveland State and Robert Morris moving from independent status. The SoCon maintained its automatic NCAA tournament berth by adding another lacrosse independent, Hampton. The ASUN men's lacrosse league was initially to be administered through the CCSA while operating under the ASUN name as part of the ASUN's intended plan to split into two conferences. This arrangement was scrapped along with the planned conference split once NJIT left for the America East; the men's lacrosse league is now directly administered by the ASUN.

The ASUN added two new beach volleyball members, Charleston and UNCW, in July 2021. At the same time, Coastal Carolina left ASUN beach volleyball for the newly formed Conference USA beach volleyball league. With the demise of SoCon women's lacrosse after the 2021 season, Coastal Carolina and Delaware State returned to the ASUN in that sport after respectively spending one and four seasons in the SoCon.

The SoCon dropped men's lacrosse after the 2022 season due to further conference realignment. Jacksonville returned men's lacrosse to the ASUN, and full SoCon member Mercer became an ASUN men's lacrosse affiliate. Lindenwood, which started a transition from D-II to D-I in 2022 as a new member of the Ohio Valley Conference, became an affiliate in both men's and women's lacrosse (neither of which is sponsored by the OVC). Also in 2022–23, the ASUN lost all four of its beach volleyball affiliates (Charleston, Mercer, Stephen F. Austin, UNCW) to the new beach volleyball league of the Sun Belt Conference.

Men's sports

Men's varsity sports not sponsored by the league which are played by ASUN schools:

In addition to the aforementioned sports:
 Bellarmine plays sprint football, a non-NCAA variant played under standard college football rules but with severe limits on player weight, as a member of the Midwest Sprint Football League.
 Queens sponsors men's rugby and triathlon, neither of which has NCAA recognition of any type. It also considers its male cheerleaders to be varsity athletes.

Women's sports

Women's varsity sports not sponsored by the league which are played by ASUN schools:

In addition to the aforementioned sports:
 Bellarmine considers the members of its all-female dance team to be varsity athletes.
 Queens considers its cheerleaders and dance team (the latter all-female, though listed on its athletic website as coeducational) to be varsity athletes.

Facilities
Departing members in red.

All Sports Championships

The Jesse C. Fletcher and Sherman Day Trophies are awarded each year to the top men's and women's program in the conference.  The Bill Bibb Trophy, combining the men's and women's results for the best overall program, was first awarded in 2006–07. East Tennessee State won this overall trophy seven of the nine years it has been awarded; Florida Gulf Coast won in 2012–13, 2014–15 and 2015-16.

Men's All Sports: Jesse C. Fletcher TrophyWomen's All Sports: Sherman Day TrophyCombined All Sports: Bill Bibb Trophy

Championships

Men's basketball
This is a partial list of the last 10 champions. For the full history, see ASUN men's basketball tournament.

Women's basketball
This is a partial list of the last 10 champions. For the full history, see ASUN women's basketball tournament.

Baseball
 ASUN Conference baseball tournament

Notes and references

External links
 

 
Sports in the Southern United States
Sports organizations established in 1978
Articles which contain graphical timelines